Manuel Atanasio Girardot Díaz (2 May 1791 – 30 September 1813) was a Colombian revolutionary leader.
Son of Louis Girardot, wealthy merchant and French miner, Girardot fought with Simón Bolívar in the Campaña Admirable and other battles. He died during the Battle of Bárbula, trying to plant the republican flag on Bárbula Hill.

Legacy
Various places have been named in tribute to him:

 Girardot, Cundinamarca, Colombia
 Girardot Municipality, Aragua, Venezuela
 Atanasio Girardot Sports Complex in Medellin

Colombian revolutionaries
People of the Venezuelan War of Independence
1791 births
1813 deaths
Colombian military personnel killed in action